Abhidhamma Day is a Theravada Buddhist tradition celebrated primarily in Myanmar. Abhidhamma Day celebrates Gautama Buddha's descent from Tāvatiṃsa heaven after teaching his mother the Abhidhamma.

It is celebrated on the full moon of the seventh month of the Burmese lunar year which starts in April, and coincides with the end of the (first) Rains Retreat and the Pavāraṇa festival. The seventh month corresponds to October. The 2018 date for this event is October 24th.

See also
 Thadingyut Festival
 Lhabab Duchen

References

Buddhist festivals in Myanmar
October observances
Observances set by the Burmese calendar
Observances held on the full moon